Brendan Ashby (born June 30, 1980) is a Zimbabwean former swimmer, who specialized in backstroke events. Since 2004, Ashby currently holds two Zimbabwean records in the 100 and 200 m backstroke from the World championships and U.S. invitational meets. He is also a former member of the swimming team for the Alabama Crimson Tide at the University of Alabama in Tuscaloosa. Ashby stands  and weighs .

Ashby qualified for the men's 100 m backstroke at the 2004 Summer Olympics in Athens, by eclipsing a FINA B-standard entry time of 58.28 from the USA Swimming Grand Prix in Indianapolis, Indiana. He challenged seven other swimmers on the second heat, including Olympic veterans Nicholas Neckles of Barbados, George Gleason of the Virgin Islands, and Sung Min of South Korea. Swimming in lane one, Ashby raced to sixth place by a 1.27-second margin behind Gleason in 58.91. Ashby failed to advance into the semifinals, as he placed thirty-ninth overall in the preliminaries.

References

1980 births
Alumni of Falcon College
Living people
Zimbabwean people of British descent
Zimbabwean male backstroke swimmers
Olympic swimmers of Zimbabwe
Swimmers at the 2004 Summer Olympics
Sportspeople from Gweru
Alabama Crimson Tide men's swimmers
White Zimbabwean sportspeople